The health of the Scottish population is, and has been for many years, worse than that of the English. Life expectancy is the lowest in the UK, at 77.1 for men and 81.1 for women, and one of the lowest in the OECD. The gap between Scotland and England has grown since 1980. Some of this is clearly attributable to economic disadvantage, but the differences in health status are more pronounced that would be expected on that basis. It has often been suggested that the Scottish diet is to blame.  This is particularly so in Glasgow and the Glasgow effect has been the subject of some academic study.

Legislation 
Following Scottish devolution 1999, responsibility for health and social care policy and funding became devolved to the Scottish Parliament.

A few aspects of Scottish health policy, such as surrogacy remain reserved powers of the UK government.

Healthcare 

Healthcare in Scotland is mainly provided by Scotland's public health service, NHS Scotland. It provides healthcare to all permanent residents free at the point of need and paid for from general taxation. Health is a matter that is devolved, and considerable differences have developed between the public healthcare systems in the different countries of the United Kingdom. Though the public system dominates healthcare provision, private healthcare and a wide variety of alternative and complementary treatments are available for those willing to pay.

Alcohol 
High rates of alcohol related illnesses pose a major public health challenge for Scotland. NHS Scotland estimate that there were 3,705 deaths attributable to alcohol consumption in 2015, this equates to 6.5% or around 1 in 15 of the deaths for the whole of Scotland for that year.

Alcohol misuse was estimated to cost the Scottish economy 3.56 billion per year in 2007. Alcohol consumption in Scotland is approximately 20% higher than in England and Wales.

Public Health Measures

Drink Driving Limit 
In December 2014, the Scottish Government reduced the legal drink driving limit in an effort to reduce the number of alcohol related deaths and serious injuries on Scottish roads. The reduction in the legal limit of blood alcohol levels from 80 mg to 50 mg in 100ml of blood brought Scotland in to line with other European countries such as France, Germany, Italy and Spain. However, in two years after the new law was introduced, the rates of road traffic accidents in Scotland have not decreased. One possible explanation is that the change in the limit may not have been enforced or publicised sufficiently to have the expected effect in reducing accidents.

Minimum Unit Pricing 

In 2012 the Scottish Government passed legislation to introduce a statutory minimum price per unit of alcohol to try to reduce alcohol consumption by harmful drinkers.  The legislation was subject to legal challenges by alcohol trade bodies including the Scotch Whisky Association but was ultimately upheld by the Supreme Court of the United Kingdom. The act came into effect on 1 May 2018 with an initial minimum price of 50p per unit.

Drugs 
The ratio of drug-related fatalities in Scotland has overtaken every other country in the UK, as well as the EU. Recent research has shown Scotland has had a larger number of drug deaths than the United States, which was thought to be the highest in the world. In the US in 2017 the rate of drug deaths of 217 per million of the population is now slightly lower than Scotland's rate (218 deaths per million of population). 

According to the Guardian newspaper, the increase in drug deaths in recent years are due to Benzodiazepines, Heroin and Ecstasy.

In 2020 1,339 deaths related to drug misuse were registered in Scotland, a 5% increase on 2019, and the highest ever recorded. 63%  were of people aged between 35 and 54, and men were 2.7 times as likely to have a drug-related death as women.  People living in the most deprived areas were 18 times more likely to die from a drug-related condition than those in the least deprived areas.  The Scottish Drug Deaths Taskforce reported that use of naloxone kits may have saved almost 1,400 lives in 2020.

In 2021, 1,187 people died in Scotland as a direct result of a drug overdose. Nearly half of the drug deaths in Scotland were attributed to methadone.

Obesity
The Health and Sport Committee has called for more action to tackle Scotland's "obesogenic environment".

Smoking
Scotland was the first country in the UK to enact a smoking ban in public places. The legislation was passed in the Scottish parliament in 2005 and came into force on 26 March 2006. The effect of the smoking ban has been found to be positive with an 18% drop in the rate of child asthma admissions per year and a 17% reduction in heart attack admissions to nine Scottish hospitals. In 2015, 87% of Scottish adults were found to be in favour of the ban, with only 8% opposed.

The tobacco control strategy has had a "positive impact".  Scottish smoking rates fell from 31% in 2003 to 21% in 2015. There is a socio-economic gradient with 35% of people living in the most deprived areas smoking compared to 10% in the most affluent areas.

Mental health
There is some evidence that Scottish patients more often seek medical help with stress, anxiety and depression than English patients. To help support this, Scotland has put in place a Mental Health Strategy. The strategy began in 2016 and will last for ten years. It aims to increase accessibility of mental healthcare towards children and adolescents, improve attitudes towards mental illness, and educate the community. The overall goal is to improve how people in Scotland live, grow, work, and age. Scotland is also looking to trial a dedicated mental health ambulance service, following success of a similar scheme in Sweden.

See also
NHS Scotland

References